The Drocourt-Quéant Line was a set of mutually supporting defensive lines constructed by Germany between the French towns of Drocourt and Quéant during World War I. This defensive system was part of the northernmost section of the Hindenburg Line, a vast German defensive system that ran through northeastern France.

It was attacked and captured by Canadian and British troops in the closing months of the war as part of Canada's Hundred Days of successful offensive campaigning that helped end the war.

Description

The Drocourt–Quéant Line ran between the French cities of Drocourt and Quéant and was part of a defensive system that ran from a point within the Hindenburg Line, eleven miles west of Cambrai, northward to within seven miles west of Douai and terminated along the front east of Armentières. The Drocourt–Quéant Line was a system in depth and incorporated a number of mutually supporting lines of defence. The system consisted of a front line system and a support line system, each consisting of two lines of trenches. The system incorporated numerous fortifications including concrete bunkers, machine gun posts and heavy belts of barbed wire.

Capture
At 5:00 a.m. on 2 September 1918, Canadian and British forces attacked the Drocourt–Quéant Line supported by tanks and aircraft. In twilight, the Canadian 1st Division attacked the line south-eastwards, on the extreme right, south of the Arras–Cambrai road, The Canadian 4th Division attacked in the centre between Dury and the main road and the British 4th Division attacked south of the River Sensee.

Seven Canadians were awarded VCs individually that day: Bellenden Hutcheson, Arthur George Knight, William Henry Metcalf, Claude Nunney, Cyrus Wesley Peck, Walter Leigh Rayfield and John Francis Young.

The next day the Germans retreated to the Hindenburg Line with the Allies taking many prisoners. The Canadian and British troops then moved on to their next battle, the Battle of the Canal du Nord.

Memorials 
The Canadian Dury Memorial commemorates the Canadian Corps attack on the Drocourt–Quéant Line in 1918.

Footnotes

References

External links

World War I sites in France
World War I defensive lines
Military history of Canada during World War I
World War I in the Pas-de-Calais